In Celtic mythology, Ecne (Wisdom, Old Irish ecna, ecne, wise, enlightened) was one of the Tuatha Dé Danann and was the god of wisdom, or knowledge.

Ecne had three fathers, Brian, Iuchar, and Iucharba, who were all sons of Brigid and Tuireann, also known as Delbáeth. They are called the tri dee Donand, meaning the three gods of Danu, which can also be read as the three gods of dán, or knowledge. Related attributes are personified as their descendants, and Wisdom is the son of all three.

For Ecne to be the son of three brothers also recalls the early Celtic practice of fraternal polyandry.

Ecne's three fathers killed Cian, the father of Lugh, and Lugh's deadly revenge is recounted in The Fate of the Children of Tuireann.

In Irish Druids and Old Irish Religions, James Bonwick reports Ecne as female and as the goddess of poetry.

References

Irish gods
Tuatha Dé Danann
Wisdom gods